Kari-Pekka Laaksonen (born 23 April 1967) is a Finnish racing driver currently competing in the TCR International Series. Having previously competed in Porsche Carrera Cup Scandinavia, Porsche GT3 Cup Finland and ADAC TCR Germany Touring Car Championship amongst others.

Business career
Laaksonen has been active in the transport sector throughout his professional career. After graduating Lappeenranta-Lahti University of Technology LUT and a number of management positions, Laaksonen became CEO of Containerships Plc in 2011 and remained at the company when it was integrated into the CMA CGM group. The Fin left the company in June 2019 to join Samskip. The move required Laaksonen to move to Rotterdam where the Samskip headquarters are located.

Racing career
Laaksonen began his career in 2010 in the Finnish V1600 Cup, he finished eighth in the championship standings that year. He switched to the Finnish Xtreme Race Cup in 2011 and finished fourteenth in the championship standings in both 2011 and 2012. In 2013 he switched to the Porsche GT3 Cup Finland series, taking three podiums in his first season in the championship. Continuing in the series in 2014, he took two wins and five podiums, finishing seventh in the championship standings that year. He only entered four races in the series in 2015, but still took one victory and two podiums. He also raced in the 2015 24 Hours of Nürburgring, finishing twelfth in the SP7 class. In 2016 he switched to the all new 2016 ADAC TCR Germany Touring Car Championship

In August 2016 it was announced that he would race in the TCR International Series, driving a SEAT León Cup Racer for LMS Racing.

Racing record

Complete TCR International Series results
(key) (Races in bold indicate pole position) (Races in italics indicate fastest lap)

TCR Spa 500 results

References

External links
 

1967 births
Living people
TCR International Series drivers
Finnish racing drivers
24H Series drivers
Finnish chief executives
Nürburgring 24 Hours drivers